is a Japanese announcer and financial planner who is the chief executive officer of Ikushima Planning Office. He is the visiting professor of Tohoku Fukushi University.

Ikushima was a TBS announcer.

Filmography

TBS

After TBS

Films

Advertisements

References

External links
 Ikushima Planning Office 
 Official profile 
 Profile at TBS Radio 

Japanese announcers
1950 births
Living people
People from Miyagi Prefecture